The 1968 All-Ireland Under-21 Football Championship was the fifth staging of the All-Ireland Under-21 Football Championship since its establishment by the Gaelic Athletic Association in 1964.

Mayo entered the championship as the defending champions, however, they were defeated by Offaly in the All-Ireland semi-final.

On 9 September 1968, Derry won the championship following a 3-9 to 1-9 defeat of Offaly in the All-Ireland final. This was their first All-Ireland title.

Results

All-Ireland Under-21 Football Championship

Semi-finals

Final

Statistics

Miscellaneous

 Offaly win the Leinster title for the first time in their history.

References

1968
All-Ireland Under-21 Football Championship